William Glover  may refer to:

 William Glover (MP for Weymouth), MP for Weymouth in 1394
 William Glover (fl. 1397), MP for Dartmouth (UK Parliament constituency)
 William Glover (MP) (1559–1629), English politician
 William Glover (North Carolina governor) (1653–1713), acting deputy governor of the province of North Carolina
 William Howard Glover (1819–1875), English musical composer and writer
 William Glover (artist) (1836–1916), Scottish artist and theatre manager
 William Glover Joy (fl. 1855–1856), builder of Moorfield House, Headingley, Leeds, England
 Billy Glover (1896–1962), English footballer
 William Elwood Glover (1915–1990), Canadian radio and television broadcaster
 Bill Glover (born 1952), Christian musician
 Little Bill Glover, protagonist of Little Bill, an American animated children's television series

See also
Charles William Glover (1806–1863), violinist and composer
William Glover Joy